Natural Wonder may refer to:
Natural Wonder, an album by American musician Stevie Wonder
Natural Wonders of the World, the natural counterparts to the Seven Wonders of the World
Natural Wonder, a cosmetics brand from Revlon Consumer Products Corporation
Natural Wonder, a series of photographs by Gregory Crewdson